The Marscholhorn (also known as Piz Moesola) is a mountain of the Swiss Lepontine Alps, overlooking the San Bernardino Pass in the canton of Graubünden. It lies at the eastern end of the range between the Hinterrhein valley and the Mesolcina, east of the Zapporthorn.

References

External links
 Marscholhorn on Hikr

Mountains of the Alps
Mountains of Switzerland
Mountains of Graubünden
Lepontine Alps
Two-thousanders of Switzerland
Rheinwald